Stoned & Dethroned is the fifth studio album by the Scottish alternative rock band The Jesus and Mary Chain. After spending most of 1992 touring, including a slot on that year's Lollapalooza tour, the band went into the studio during January 1993 with the notion of recording an acoustic album. For the first time since Psychocandy, JAMC recorded with a full band with Steve Monti from Curve playing drums and touring bassist Ben Lurie. The recording took longer than planned, lasting the better part of a year. The album also features lead vocals from guests Shane MacGowan from The Pogues on "God Help Me" and Mazzy Star's Hope Sandoval, singing a duet with Jim Reid on "Sometimes Always", which was the album's first single.

As of May 1998 the album has sold 121,000 copies in United States according to Nielsen SoundScan.

Track listing
All songs written by William Reid, except where noted.

"Dirty Water" – 3:08
"Bullet Lovers" – 3:39
"Sometimes Always" – 2:32
"Come On" (J. Reid) – 2:13
"Between Us" – 2:59
"Hole" (Jim Reid) – 2:15
"Never Saw It Coming" – 3:32
"She" (Jim Reid) – 3:08
"Wish I Could" – 2:42
"Save Me" (J. Reid, W. Reid) – 2:43
"Till It Shines" – 3:17
"God Help Me" – 2:47
"Girlfriend" – 3:16
"Everybody I Know" – 2:13
"You've Been a Friend" (J. Reid) – 3:37
"These Days" – 2:31
"Feeling Lucky" – 2:18

Personnel

The Jesus and Mary Chain
 Jim Reid – vocals (tracks 1 – 4, 6, 8, 10, 13 – 15), guitar, bass (tracks 6, 12, 13,  14), shaker (track 17),  production
 William Reid – vocals (tracks 5, 7, 9 - 11, 16, 17), guitar, bass (track 17), production
 Ben Lurie – guitar, harmonica, organ, bass
 Steve Monti – drums, percussion

Additional personnel
 Hope Sandoval – vocals (track 3) 
 Shane MacGowan – vocals (track 12)
 Alan Moulder – engineer (tracks 1, 2, 9, 11, 14), mixing (tracks 1, 2, 7, 9, 13, 14)
 Dick Meaney – engineer (tracks 3 to 8, 10, 12, 13, 15 to 17), mixing (tracks 3 to 6, 8, 10 to 12, 15 to 17)
 Stylorouge – design
 Sophie Muller – photography

References

The Jesus and Mary Chain albums
1994 albums
Blanco y Negro Records albums